Bennington is an unincorporated community in central Pleasant Township, Switzerland County, in the U.S. state of Indiana. Although Bennington is unincorporated, it has a post office, with the ZIP code of 47011.

History
An old variant name of the community was called Slawson. A post office was established under this name in 1838, and was renamed to Bennington in 1848. The post office is still currently operating.

Geography
The community lies along the Bennington Pike north of the town of Vevay, the county seat of Switzerland County.  Its elevation is 889 feet (271 m), and it is located at  (38.8589483, -85.1405093).

References

Unincorporated communities in Switzerland County, Indiana
Unincorporated communities in Indiana